Richard Seddon (11 February 1825 – 13 July 1884) was an English cricketer who played in first-class cricket matches for Nottinghamshire, Cambridge University and amateur sides between 1845 and 1847. He was born in Leicester and died in Bournemouth, then in Hampshire, now Dorset.

References

1825 births
1884 deaths
English cricketers
Nottinghamshire cricketers
Cambridge University cricketers
North v South cricketers
Gentlemen of England cricketers